Tina Wunderlich (born 10 October 1977) is a German former football defender. She played for 1. FFC Frankfurt, and was capped for the Germany women's national football team.

Club career 

Wunderlich retired from football in 2010, after a long career with 1. FFC Frankfurt which yielded seven Frauen Bundesliga titles and seven Frauen DFB Pokal cups. She also collected winners' medals in three editions of what is now the UEFA Women's Champions League.

International career 

She made her debut for the senior Germany national team on 25 September 1994, in an 11–0 destruction of Switzerland in Weingarten. In 1995 she was part of the German squad which finished runners – up in the Women's World Cup, playing in one match against Brazil. During the course of her 34–cap international career, Wunderlich also played in the 1999 Women's World Cup, won a bronze medal at the 2000 Olympic Games and was part of the victorious UEFA Women's Euro 2001 squad. Her final appearance came against China in March 2003. Sister Pia also played in the match.

Honours

Club 
1. FFC Frankfurt

 UEFA Women's Cup (3): 2002, 2006, 2008
 Frauen Bundesliga (7): 1999, 2001, 2002, 2003, 2005, 2007, 2008
 Frauen DFB Pokal (7): 1999, 2000, 2001, 2002, 2003, 2007, 2008

International 
Germany

 UEFA Women's Championship (1): 2001

References 

 

1977 births
Living people
German women's footballers
Germany women's international footballers
1995 FIFA Women's World Cup players
1999 FIFA Women's World Cup players
Footballers at the 1996 Summer Olympics
Footballers at the 2000 Summer Olympics
Olympic bronze medalists for Germany
People from Siegen-Wittgenstein
Sportspeople from Arnsberg (region)
1. FFC Frankfurt players
Olympic medalists in football
Medalists at the 2000 Summer Olympics
Olympic footballers of Germany
UEFA Women's Championship-winning players
Women's association football defenders
Footballers from North Rhine-Westphalia